Gedai or Godayi or Geday may refer to:
 Gedai, Bushehr
 Gedai, West Azerbaijan
 Geday, West Azerbaijan